Lower Ship Harbour is a rural community of the Halifax Regional Municipality in the Canadian province of Nova Scotia. Lower Ship Harbour is home to The Deanery Project. This non-profit organization acts as a community centre and hall for events on the Eastern Shore of Nova Scotia.

References
 Explore HRM

Communities in Halifax, Nova Scotia
General Service Areas in Nova Scotia